Mary Lorraine Ward (6 March 1915 – 19 July 2021), also known as Mary Ward Breheny, was an Australian actress of stage, television, and film, and a radio announcer and performer and commercial spokeswoman and media personality. Her career spanned seven decades. Ward trained in England and Australia, and worked in both countries.
 
Ward during the outbreak of World War II, was in high demand as a stage actress in England, before returning to Australia where she worked in local theatre, and became one of the first female radio announcers at the ABC in Australia, billed as the Forces Sweetheart on Radio Australia.
 
At ABC Television, she appeared in a number of filmed stage plays, as well as featuring in Australian films, both made-for-television and theatrical, including the film Amy.

She is perhaps best known—both locally and internationally—as an actress portraying elderly characters in television soap opera roles, including  Prisoner, as one of the original characters, "Mum" Jeanette Brookes in which she appeared sporadically from 1979 and 1981,

Ward featured briefly in soap opera Sons and Daughters in 1983 as Dee Morrell, in which she was classified as a recurring guest role (season 2 - Episodes 305–337).

Ward also had small guest roles in The Young Doctors, Neighbours and Blue Heelers. In 2020, Ward, who resided in Melbourne, turned 105 years old, and was at the time the oldest living actress in Australia.

Biography

Early life and career in Britain

Ward was born in Fremantle, Western Australia on 6 March 1915, to a pearler-turned-publican.

Ward attended boarding school and began acting professionally shortly after leaving high school, and later studied at the Perth drama school, where she befriended mining magnate Lang Hancock. She also studied in Britain, and worked as a teacher of elocution and meeting Lionel Logue who was a speech therapist who helped King George VI, overcome his stutter. Ward travelled to England in 1938, where she worked in England repertory, with contemporaries Trevor Howard and John McCallum and also in television and film, before returning to Australia in 1940, working at the Minerva Theatre and became alongside Dorothy Crawford (the sister of television impresario Hector Crawford) one of the first female radio announcers for the Australian Broadcasting Corporation (then Commission) during the war, where she was billed as "The Forces Sweetheart", whilst also appearing radio play productions  
 
She returned to England in 1948, to pursue work in radio, stage, television and film, and appeared in the first televised serial production at ITV and featured in television commercials doing sewing demonstrations, sponsored by Vogue, while also performing parts for the British Broadcasting Corporation, and appeared in a cameo role in the 1949 film, Eureka Stockade.

Ward made her first television appearance as a minor character in detective series The Vise - originally titled Saber of London - in 1954, and in the television movie The High-Flying Head the following year. She had starring roles in the television movies Marriage Lines and The Tower.

Career: television, stage and film

She began working in television full-time in Australia after having returned in 1956, firstly working at the ABC, whilst continuing a successful media career, and being the first woman to present fashions on the field, in the 1960s at the annual Melbourne Cup spring racing carnival.

Ward featured at commercial stations, in serials from 1970s with Andrew McFarlane, Robert Bettles and Tom Farley (actor) in 1977. Harness Fever would later appear as a two-part episode, Born to Ride, on Wonderful World of Disney in 1979. She continued her stage work in the 1970s with the Melbourne Theatre Company, remaining with the company until 1983, and performing in a David Williamson stage production.

Prisoner and Sons and Daughters

In 1979, Ward first appeared in one of her best known roles, "Mum" (Jeanette) Brooks, on the popular soap opera  Prisoner. She portrayed an elderly institutionalised inmate, serving an eighteen-year prison sentence for the euthanisation of her terminally-ill husband Jim Brooks. When the filming schedule for the series increased from one to two hours per week in 1979, she and co-star Carol Burns decided to leave the series. However, her character remained a popular one during the show's early years, and she reprised her role occasionally until her character died off-screen in 1983. She starred with a number of her fellow Prisoner co-stars in the 1981 television movie I Can Jump Puddles as a character called Mrs. Birdsworth.

She was given the prominent role as scheming Dee Morrell in Sons and Daughters during 1983.

The Hendersons

Ward starred in the 1985 television series The Henderson Kids and its 1987 follow-up series The Henderson Kids II.

Later film and TV

During the late-1980s, she had supporting roles in films Jenny Kissed Me and Backstage as well as appearing in more soap guest roles including G.P. and Neighbours in 1989. After starring in the 1989 television movie Darlings of the Gods, she returned again to the theatre, with the exception of an appearance in the television series The Damnation of Harvey McHugh in 1994, and appearing in the film Amy in 1997. In 1991, she appeared in the play Alive and Kicking.

Between 1999 and 2000, she played the recurring character Betty Withers in the police drama Blue Heelers. She retired from the industry in 2000.

Death

Ward died on 19 July 2021, aged 106, in Melbourne, Victoria.

Filmography

Film

Television

References

External links 
 

1915 births
2021 deaths
Actresses from Western Australia
Australian soap opera actresses
Australian stage actresses
Australian radio personalities
Australian women radio presenters
People from Fremantle
Australian film actresses
20th-century Australian actresses
Australian centenarians
21st-century Australian actresses
Women centenarians
Australian expatriates in the United Kingdom